Livin' in the City is the fifth studio album by the Fun Lovin' Criminals, released in 2005.

Track listing 
 "I Love Livin' in the City" - 3:45
 "How It Be" - 3:57
 "That Ain't Right" - 3:06
 "The Preacher" - 2:47
 "Ballad of NYC" - 5:36
 "Is Ya Alright" - 2:52
 "Gave Up on God" - 4:55
 "City Boy" - 3:14
 "Girl with the Scar" - 4:23
 "Mi Corazon" - 3:25
 "Will I Be Ready" - 6:01

External links 
 

Fun Lovin' Criminals albums
2005 albums
Sanctuary Records albums